Sadashiv Bhaskar Ranade (IAST: Sadāśiva Bhāskara Rānaḍe; born 1912) was an Indian biographer, historian and genealogist. He is most notable for having documented the family histories and genealogies of several Chitpavan brahmin families into almanacs called Kulavruttantas in Marathi, from 1969 to 1982.

List of works 
 रानडे कुलवृत्तांत [The Ranade Family Almanac] (1969)
 रानडे कुलवृत्तांत : पूर्वाणी [The Ranade Family Almanac : Addendum] (1971)
 आगाशे कुलवृत्तांत [The Agashe Family Almanac] (1974)
 मनोहर कुलवृत्तांत [The Manohar Family Almanac] (1977)
 रिसबड कुलवृत्तांत [The Risbud Family Almanac] (1978)
 फाटक कुलवृत्तांत [The Phatak Family Almanac] (1982)

References 

1912 births
Year of death missing
Marathi people
20th-century Indian historians
Indian biographers
Indian genealogists
20th-century Indian writers
20th-century Indian male writers
Marathi-language writers